The Blaues Kartell is a circle of four German Student Corps, or Corps (Studentenverbindung) for short, who understand the union as "one fraternity spanning four cities". The member fraternities are the Corps Altsachsen Dresden, Saxo-Thuringia München, Berlin and Hannoverania Hannover.

The Blaues Kartell is the largest one of similar circles within the Weinheimer Senioren-Convent (WSC), the second oldest federation of classical fraternities found in Europe, its roots dating back to the 15th century A.D.

History 
The Blaues Kartell was founded on April 24, 1874 by Landsmannschaft (today Corps) Hannoverania Hannover and Landsmannschaft Feronia Berlin (later Corps Teutonia, today part of Corps Berlin). Both fraternities belonged to the local Berliner SC of veterinary-medical Landsmannschaften. Over the years, the Blaues Kartell grew as new fraternities with compatible ideals of the enlightenment joined and left:

 1874 Initiation by Hannoverania Hannover and Feronia Berlin (later Corps Teutonia, today Corps Berlin)
 1875 Hippokratia München (until suspension in 1879)
 1885 Landsmannschaft Nicaria Stuttgart (until it fused with Saxo-Thuringia München in 1910)
 1899 Saxo-Thuringia München
 1900 Albingia Aachen (until it fused with Marko-Guestphalia Aachen in 1996)
 1933 Frisia Frankfurt (until it suspended due to Nazi pressure in 1935)
 1993 Altsachsen Dresden
 2010 Corps Berlin (established in 2009 by fusion of Corps Teutonia, Cheruscia, and Rheno-Guestphalia in Berlin)

The constitution of the Blaues Kartell stipulates that a member fraternity that merges with another (external) fraternity, will lose its membership with the Blaues Kartell. The reason is that newly formed fraternities are understood to be inhomogeneous, thus first need to internally debate and decide to re-join the Blaues Kartell, then successfully petition to be accepted as an equal member of the Kartell again, a process which requires the current Kartell members to agree on the new potential member.

As a result of formerly being a member but not yet having re-joined the Kartell, a friendly relationship exists with Corps Marko-Guestphalia Aachen that has its origin in Marko-Guestphalia's history: the former Corps Albingia Dresden existed until its suspension due to Nazi pressure against the German Student Corps in the 1930s and remained dormant for years before being reconstructed in Aachen after the war. The fusion of the reconstructed, now Corps Albingia Aachen with the Corps Marko-Guestphalia in 1996 caused Albingia having to exit the Kartell. Marko-Guestphalia and Saxo-Thuringia thereafter established an official relationship to commemorate the former band between the two fraternities.

The four members

Literature 
 Lees Knowles: A day with corps-students in Germany

References

External links 
 

Weinheimer Senioren-Convent
Student societies in Germany
Academic culture
Organizations established in 1874
1874 establishments in Germany